Twilio is an American company based in San Francisco, California, which provides programmable communication tools for making and receiving phone calls, sending and receiving text messages, and performing other communication functions using its web service APIs.

History
Twilio was founded in 2008 by Jeff Lawson, Evan Cooke, and John Wolthuis and was originally based in both Seattle, Washington, and San Francisco, California.

Twilio's first major press coverage, in November 2008, was the result of an application built by Jeff Lawson to rickroll people, which investor Dave McClure used on TechCrunch founder and editor Michael Arrington as a prank. A few days later, on November 20, 2008, the company launched Twilio Voice, an API to make and receive phone calls completely hosted in the cloud. Twilio's text messaging API was released in February 2010, and SMS shortcodes were released in public beta in July 2011.

Twilio raised approximately $103 million in venture capital growth funding. Twilio received its first round of seed funding in March 2009 for an undisclosed amount from Mitch Kapor, The Founders Fund, Dave McClure, David G. Cohen, Chris Sacca, Manu Kumar, from K9 Ventures and Jeff Fluhr. Twilio's first A round of funding was led by Union Square Ventures for $3.7 million and its second B round of funding, for $12 million, was led by Bessemer Venture Partners. Twilio received $17 million in a Series C round in December 2011 from Bessemer Venture Partners and Union Square Ventures. In July 2013 Twilio received another $70 million from Redpoint Ventures, Draper Fisher Jurvetson (DFJ) and Bessemer Venture Partners. In July 2015, Twilio raised a $130 million Series E from Fidelity, T Rowe Price, Altimeter Capital Management, and Arrowpoint Partners, in addition to Amazon and Salesforce.

Twilio filed for IPO and started trading on June 23, 2016 with a 92% increase on the first day.

In March 2020, Twilio announced the appointment of Steve Pugh as Chief Security Officer and Glenn Weinstein as Chief Customer Officer.

On August 4, 2022, an unknown attacker gained access to Twilio's internal network through an SMS phishing campaign targeting Twilio's employees. Twilio confirmed the breach three days later, clarifying that it affected only "a limited number" of customer accounts. On August 15, Signal announced that it had been affected by the breach, indicating that the 125 customers affected included at least some enterprise accounts. 

In September 2022, Twilio laid off 11% of its workforce to become profitable. In the company announcement, CEO Jeff Lawson claimed decisions of which employees to lay off were made through an "anti-racist/anti-oppression lens." The company announced an additional 17% cut in its workforce, nearly 1,500 employees, in February 2023. As part of the restructuring, the company also announced creation of two business unitsTwilio Data & Applications and Twilio Communications.

Reception
Twilio is known for its use of platform evangelism to acquire customers. An early example is GroupMe, which was founded in May 2010 at the TechCrunch Disrupt hackathon and uses Twilio's text messaging product to facilitate group chat. GroupMe raised $10.6 million in venture funding in January 2011.

Following the success of TechCrunch Disrupt, seed accelerator 500 Startups (now 500 Global) announced the Twilio Fund, a $250,000 "micro-fund" to provide seed money to startups using Twilio in September 2010.

Acquisitions
In February 2015, Twilio acquired Authy, a Y Combinator-backed startup that offers two-factor authentication services to end users, developers and enterprises.

In September 2016, Twilio acquired Tikal Technologies, the development team behind the Kurento WebRTC open source project, for $8.5 million.

In February 2017, Twilio acquired Beepsend, a Swedish-based SMS messaging provider, for an undisclosed amount.

In September 2018, Twilio announced they were acquiring Ytica, a Prague, Czech Republic-based speech analytics firm, for an undisclosed amount.

In October 2018, Twilio announced they were acquiring SendGrid, a Denver, Colorado-based customer communication platform for transactional and marketing email, for $2 billion. In February 2019, the two companies were formally merged in a deal valued at $3 billion.

In November 2018, Twilio acquired Core Network Dynamics GmbH, a Berlin, Germany-based virtual evolved packet core company.

In July 2020, Twilio announced they had acquired Electric Imp, an internet of things platform company, for an undisclosed amount. In October of that year, Twilio acquired Segment, a platform to collect, clean, and activate customer data, for $3.2 billion.

In May 2021, Twilio announced that they were acquiring Ionic Security, a data security platform for $30.2 million,  and Zipwhip, a toll-free messaging services provider, for $850 million.

In January 2022, Twilio announced that they entered into an agreement to acquire Boku Identity, Inc. from Boku, Inc. for $32.3 million.

Technology
Twilio uses Amazon Web Services to host its communication infrastructure via APIs. Twilio follows a set of architectural design principles to protect against unexpected outages and received praise for staying online during the widespread Amazon Web Services outage in April 2011.

Rather than using industry standard protocols such as SIP for call control Twilio uses a customized markup language known as TwIML to allow for direct integration with its services. Twilio and the customer typically exchange TwIML documents via HTTP Webhook.

Open-source contributions 
Twilio is known to support the development of open-source software. In June 2010 Twilio launched OpenVBX, an open-source product that lets business users configure phone numbers to receive and route phone calls. One month later, Twilio engineer Kyle Conroy released Stashboard, an open-source status dashboard written in the Python programming language that any API or software service can use to display whether their service is functioning properly. 

Twilio also sponsors Localtunnel, created by former engineer Jeff Lindsay, which enables software developers to expose their local development environment to the public Internet from behind a NAT.

Twilio lists a number of other open-source projects on their website, such as:
 Flask Restful: Python Flask (web framework) to build REST APIs. 
 Shadow: Runs requests through a release candidate with real production traffic.
 Banker’s Box: Wrapper for storage backend.

See also
 Infobip
 MirrorFly
 Matrix (protocol)
 Textlocal
 TextMagic
 Trumpia
 Unified communications

References

External links
 
 

Cloud computing providers
American companies established in 2008
Computer companies established in 2008
Telecommunications companies established in 2008
Companies based in San Francisco
Cloud communication platforms
Companies listed on the New York Stock Exchange
500 Startups companies
2016 initial public offerings
Information technology companies of the United States